Laxmi Narayan Singh (16 October 1944 - 28 July 2016) known professionally as Lachhu Maharaj was an Indian Tabla 
Player of Banaras Gharana. Maharaj was born on 16 October 1944 to Vasudev Narayan Singh. His sister is Nirmala Devi, mother of Bollywood actor Govind Arun Ahuja. He was married to an Indian woman, she was a famous Kathak dancer Annapurna Mishra Singh and they had one daughter Rachna. After Annapurna's sad demise, he married Swiss woman Teena and they had one daughter Narayani. He had given many professional tabla performances performed all over the world. He was featured in films. He was nominated for Padma Shri but refused to accept it he felt that the appreciations of his audience was enough for him.

Death 
Maharaj Singh died on 28 July 2016, at the age of 71. He was cremated in Manikarnika Ghat in Varanasi, in the Indian state of Uttar Pradesh.

Condolences were received from Indian Prime Minister, Narendra Modi. Politician Sonia Gandhi commented that "His contributions to classical as well as the popular film genre would forever inspire artistes in the years to come."

Then Chief Minister of Uttar Pradesh, Akhilesh Yadav, said in his condolence message that 'Lacchu Maharaj popularized tabla playing internationally with his talented performances, and his death was a huge loss'.

Classical singer Girija Devi said it was an irreparable loss, and Maharaj knew the nuances of tabla like no other artist.

On 16 October 2018, Google dedicated a doodle to Lachhu Maharaj on his 74th birthday anniversary.

References 

Tabla players
Tabla gharanas
Indian male classical musicians
Benares gharana
Musicians from Varanasi
Hindustani instrumentalists
1944 births
2016 deaths